Fahad Al-Harbi (born 25 February 1997) is a Saudi Arabian professional footballer who plays as a defender for Saudi Professional League side Al-Adalah on loan from Al-Fateh.

Career
Al-Harbi started his career at the youth team of Al-Raed and represented the club at every level except the senior level. On 30 April 2016, joined youth team of Al-Ahli, On 14 February 2019, joined Al-Bukayriyah, On 30 September 2020, joined Al-Fateh on a four-year deal. On 27 August 2022, Al-Harbi joined Al-Adalah on loan.

References

External links
 

1997 births
Living people
Saudi Arabian footballers
Saudi Arabia youth international footballers
Association football defenders
Al-Raed FC players
Al-Ahli Saudi FC players
Al-Bukayriyah FC players
Al-Fateh SC players
Al-Adalah FC players
Saudi Second Division players
Saudi First Division League players
Saudi Professional League players